The International Women's Cricket Council was formed in February 1958 by the women's cricket associations of Australia, England, the Netherlands, New Zealand and South Africa to organise international matches between the countries.

In 2005 it was merged with the International Cricket Council (ICC) to form one unified body to help manage and develop cricket.

List of members
The IWCC had a maximum of 13 members at one time, and 17 members in total in the course of its history. Founding members are marked with a dagger (†).

Full members
  (from 1958) †
  (1973–1978)
  (from 1985)
  (from 1958) †
  (from 1973)
  (from 1985)
  (1969–1978)
  (from 1958) †
  (from 1958) †
  (from 1997)
  (from 1958) †
  (from 1997)
  (1973–1978)
  (from 1978)
Affiliate members
  (from 1995)
  (from 1995)

Observers
  (1993 only)
  (1976–1978)

References

Cricket administration
Sports organizations established in 1958
Women's international cricket